Rilindja Tower is a government office building for the Government of Kosovo. At 89 meters high it hold 19 floors.

The building offers government offices for 4 ministries in Kosovo. The building was created when Kosovo was under Yugoslavia's government. Its close to many  points of interest in Pristina. Such as the Palace of Youth and Sports and Fadil Vokrri Stadium. The architect Bhgjet Pacolli and his construction group mabetex reconstructed the tower.

See also 
 List of tallest buildings in Kosovo

References 

Buildings and structures in Pristina
Office buildings completed in 1980
Government buildings completed in 1980